İyidere is a town in Rize Province on the Black Sea coast of north-eastern Turkey, 14 km from the city of Rize. It is the seat of İyidere District. Its population is 5,362 (2021).

Formerly known as Aspet, İyidere is a green rural district. The local economy depends on growing and processing tea, plus some other farming and fishing.

Climate
İyidere has a humid subtropical climate (Köppen: Cfa).

History
See Rize Province for the history of the area, once part of the trading network of the Ancient Greeks based in Miletos, who founded the port of İyidere, then part of the Roman Empire, the Byzantine Empire and the Empire of Trebizond until it was brought into the Ottoman Empire by Mehmet II in 1461.

References

External links
  Municipality's official website
 and photo gallery

Populated places in Rize Province
Fishing communities in Turkey
Populated coastal places in Turkey
İyidere District